Mihai Bîră Jr. (born 8 March 1961) is a Romanian alpine skier. He competed in two events at the 1984 Winter Olympics.

References

1961 births
Living people
Romanian male alpine skiers
Olympic alpine skiers of Romania
Alpine skiers at the 1984 Winter Olympics
Sportspeople from Brașov